Mzansi Magic is a South African digital satellite and general entertainment channel created by Multichoice and run by M-Net's local interest division, and is broadcast on DStv.

History 
The channel launched in mid-July 2010 on channel 107 as M-Net's platform to boost local production and showcase entertainment in South Africa. Through the channels development, M-Net would engage with local producers, partnering with South African filmmakers to create gripping content with universal appeal while empowering  new and upcoming talent and ensuring that key skills are transferred to the industry.

The channel launched with a six-hour programming block with a mix original local series and international movies. It was headed by film veteran Lebone Maema. The channel began broadcasting in HD on the 24th July 2015.

Programming
Mzansi Magic primarily focuses on original local productions and feature films from South Africa, with a few additions of international content.

Soapies, Dramas and Telenovelas 
The channel carries original drama series and telenovelas. Titles include The Queen, Gomora, Isibaya ,Umbuso,Umkhokha:The Curse , Housekeepers and DiepCity. The channel also carries drama series from its sister channels and co-productions from Showmax like Jacob's Cross,Diep City, The River , Grassroots and Trackers.

Reality, Talk and Magazine 
The channel has a strong focus on highly popular reality series, most notably Date My Family, Our Perfect Wedding, Mnakwethu, Idols South Africa, Living The Dream with Somizi and Being Bonang amongst others. It also includes international talk shows like The Talk and The Doctors.

Sports 
The carries some content which is simulcasted with SuperSport. This includes highlights of WWE Raw and SmackDown, as well as the Nedbank Ke Yona Team Search.

Music 
The channel has music specials and interviews with local artists.

Movies 
Initially, the channel carried several international movie titles and as time went on it worked with new upcoming producers and veterans in the industry. The channel has come to categories these made-for-TV movie titles as 'Lokshin Bioskop' and proved to be popular amongst DStv subscribers.

References

Satellite television
Television stations in South Africa
2010 establishments in South Africa
Mass media companies established in 2010
Television channels and stations established in 2010